The Castle is a historic Gothic Revival style home in Marietta, Ohio, USA.

Since 1994 is has been operated as museum.

External links 
 The Castle web site

References 

Buildings and structures in Marietta, Ohio
Houses in Washington County, Ohio
National Register of Historic Places in Washington County, Ohio
Museums in Washington County, Ohio
Historic house museums in Ohio
Historic district contributing properties in Ohio
Houses on the National Register of Historic Places in Ohio